Pat Lovell (born November 1, 1937) is an American wrestler. He competed in the men's Greco-Roman light heavyweight at the 1964 Summer Olympics.

References

1937 births
Living people
American male sport wrestlers
Olympic wrestlers of the United States
Wrestlers at the 1964 Summer Olympics
Sportspeople from Richmond, California